Appleshaw is a village in the English county of Hampshire. The name Appleshaw is derived from Old English ‘scarga’ - a shaugh or wood; thus Appleshaw may mean ‘apple wood’. It includes the hamlet of Ragged Appleshaw, the ‘ragged’ possibly being a corruption of ‘roe gate’ - the gate of the Royal Deer Forest of Chute. The northern boundary of the parish is the Wiltshire border.

This small parish lies on the Wiltshire border and includes the hamlets of Redenham and Ragged Appleshaw, including part of Redenham Park. Granted the right to two annual fairs in 1658, Appleshaw became a rival to the great Weyhill sheep fair.

The Salisbury Journal in 1801 reported that 15,000 sheep were sold at Appleshaw - a reduction on the previous year's total.

W. G. Grace once played cricket here, with his bat made of Wallop willow.

In the middle of the street a clock sticks out from a barn wall, placed there to celebrate Queen Victoria's jubilee.

Education
Appleshaw has one school, Appleshaw St Peter's CE Primary School.

References

External links

Official site

Villages in Hampshire
Test Valley